Dirt and worms is an American cake made from sandwich cookies and vanilla pudding in combination with other ingredients to create a dessert that has a resemblance to soil or earth. It is made by combining crushed Oreo cookies on top of vanilla or chocolate pudding, and adding gummy candy worms on top. Variations include vanilla wafers, vanilla pudding, and cream cheese pudding in the recipe.

See also
 Mississippi mud pie
 Mud pie, an inedible item created as part of a children's pretend game

References

External links
Example recipe: A Three Year Old's Dream: Dirt Cake from Mindy's Mouthful

American cakes